Esmailabad (also Romanized as Esmā‘īlābād) is a village in Doruneh Rural District, Anabad District, Bardaskan County, Razavi Khorasan Province, Iran. At the 2006 census, its population was 185, in 39 families.

References 

Populated places in Bardaskan County